The Versteeg-Swisher House is a two-story brick Gothic Revival house on a limestone foundation located at 506 S. Campbell in Abilene, Kansas. It was built about 1888 by Dutch brickmaker Nicholas Versteeg and was listed on the National Register of Historic Places in 2005.

References

Houses on the National Register of Historic Places in Kansas
Gothic Revival architecture in Kansas
Houses completed in 1888
Dickinson County, Kansas